This is a list of administrators and governors of Sokoto State, Nigeria, which was formed on 3 February 1976 when North-Western State was split into Niger and Sokoto states.

See also
States of Nigeria
List of state governors of Nigeria

References

External links
Sokoto State Government

Sokoto
Governors